Kurai may refer to:
Kurai (flute), a long open endblown flute
Band Kurai, a town in Dera Ismail Khan, Khyber Pakhtunkhwa, Pakistan
Kurai, Khyber Pakhtunkhwa, a town in Dera Ismail Khan, Khyber Pakhtunkhwa, Pakistan
Kuray Mountains, a belt of mountains in Altai Krai, Russia